Tariq Anam Khan (born May 10, 1953) is a Bangladeshi actor, director, writer and producer in theatre, television, and film. He was awarded the Bangladesh National Film Award for Best Actor in Negative role for the film Desha: The Leader in 2014 and in 2019 for the film Abar Bosonto. He is founding member and leader of prominent Bangladeshi theatre group, Natyakendra, where he holds the position of Principal Secretary.

Khan was a freedom fighter in the liberation war of Bangladesh in 1971.

Early life
Born in Satkhira, Tariq Anam Khan is the eldest son of Fakhrul Anam Khan and Jahanara Khanam. He has 3 brothers and 4 sisters.

Career

Theatre
Khan started his career as theatre artist. He joined Bangladeshi theatre group "Theatre" after his return from the National School of Drama. Later, he parted ways with Theatre due to some differences in opinion and founded Natyakendra on October 11, 1990 along with Jhuna Chowdhury, Tauqir Ahmed, and Nahid Ferdous Meghna. The group has recently passed 25 years of establishment. In 25 years, Natyakendra has staged 14 production of which 11 was directed by Tariq Anam Khan. The group's first production Bichchu (adapted from Molière's That Scoundrel Scapin) is considered one of the iconic productions in Bangladesh theatre history. His directed plays have performed more than 500 shows in Bangladesh and abroad.

Advertising
Khan started his career in marketing by founding an advertising firm Adshop in 1985. He was credited as the production supervisor of Bangladesh unit of the 2015 Hollywood film Avengers: Age of Ultron. He started working as a marketing adviser of Akij Group in 2015.

Television
Khan has been acting in television plays for more than 30 years. He has acted in over 300 television plays telecast in all national and satellite television channels in Bangladesh. He gained popularity for his portrayal of a smuggler in television series Tothapi (1994) directed by Zia Ansary, which was telecast on Bangladesh Television. He has also won several awards for his roles on television.

Personal life 
Khan is married to actress Nima Rahman since 1985. Together they have a son, Ariq Anam Khan.

Filmography

Stage plays

Natyakendra

Web series

Awards
Bangladesh National Film Awards – 2014 for Best Performance in a Negative Role – Desha: The Leader
Critics Choice Awards – 2012 for Best Actor (Film) for Ghetuputra Komola in 15th Meril Prothom Alo Awards, 2013.
Bangladesh National Film Awards – 2019 for Best Actor – Abar Boshonto (2019)

See also
 Cinema of Bangladesh
 Bangladeshi film actor
 Cinema of Bangladesh

References

External links
 

Male actors in Bengali cinema
Bangladeshi television personalities
People from Satkhira District
Best Performance in a Negative Role National Film Award (Bangladesh) winners
Living people
1953 births
Bangladeshi male film actors
People from Khulna
Best Actor National Film Award (Bangladesh) winners